Basheer Al-Khewani (born 1 May 1982) is a Yemeni track and field sprint athlete who competes internationally for Yemen. He competed in the 400 metres at the 2000 Summer Olympics.

Career
Al-Khewani was just eighteen years old when he competed at the 2000 Summer Olympics which were held in Sydney, Australia. He entered the 400 metres and ran a time of 49.72 seconds and came eighth in his heat, so didn't qualify for the next round.

References

External links
 

1982 births
Living people
Yemeni male sprinters
Olympic athletes of Yemen
Athletes (track and field) at the 2000 Summer Olympics
Athletes (track and field) at the 1998 Asian Games
Asian Games competitors for Yemen
20th-century Yemeni people